The East Side Review was an American, English language newspaper headquartered in St. Paul, Minnesota, until publication ceased in September 2019. While it was published, it was the only neighborhood-focused, general-interest weekly newspaper in either Minneapolis or St. Paul.

Coverage
With a circulation of 20,000, the East Side Review reported on the entire East Side area, all 28 neighborhoods and 90,000 residents in St. Paul located east of Interstate Highway 35E.

Published also online, the free weekly newspaper was the only urban newspaper published by Lillie Suburban Newspapers, a third-generation publisher of 10 other suburban weeklies based out of North Saint Paul. Staff at the East Side Review have gone on to write and photograph for publications as prestigious as Life Magazine and The New York Times.

Neighborhoods covered included:

Arlington Heights
Battle Creek
Beaver Lake
Conway
Dayton's Bluff
Duluth-Case
Frost Lake
East Phalen
Eastview
Hayden Heights
Hazel Park
Highwood
Hillcrest
Lafayette Park
Lincoln Park
Mounds Park
Parkway
Payne-Arcade
Phalen Heights
Phalen Village/Ames Lake
Pig's Eye
Prosperity
Railroad Island
Rivoli Bluff
Upper Swede Hollow
Vento
Wheelock Park
Williams Hill

References

Newspapers published in Minnesota
Mass media in Minneapolis–Saint Paul